James Michael Gunning (25 June 1929 – 27 August 1993) was a Scottish professional football winger. He played in the Scottish Football League for Hibernian and in the English Football League for Manchester City and Barrow.

Born in Helensburgh, Gunning was a junior with Wolverhampton Wanderers, but was unable to settle and returned to Scotland in 1946, signing for Hibernian as an amateur. He then joined the Royal Air Force; a posting in the Highlands allowed Gunning to play Highland League football for Forres Mechanics. After leaving the RAF, Gunning returned to Easter Road, but he found first team opportunities very limited as Hibs enjoyed the services of The Famous Five. He played once for Hibs in a league match, during the 1950–51 season.

Gunning signed for Manchester City in November 1950. During three seasons with the club, Gunning made 13 league appearances. He left City in 1953, joining non-league Weymouth but in 1954 returned to the Football League when he joined Barrow, playing ten times in the 1954–55 season.

Gunning played once for Mossley in the 1957–58 season.

References

1929 births
1993 deaths
People from Helensburgh
Association football wingers
Scottish footballers
Hibernian F.C. players
Manchester City F.C. players
Weymouth F.C. players
Barrow A.F.C. players
Mossley A.F.C. players
Scottish Football League players
English Football League players
20th-century Royal Air Force personnel
Forres Mechanics F.C. players
Sportspeople from Argyll and Bute
Highland Football League players